The Michigan Hot Rod Association is an association of 7 smaller clubs in Michigan.  The association puts on the Detroit Autorama car show held every year in March at TCF Center in Detroit, Michigan.  The Association also hosts the Rod Repair Trailer which goes around to various NSRA and other events to help show participants in need of repair.

The association consists of these 7 clubs:
 Motor City Modified
 Bearing Burners
 Competition Specialists
 Millwinders
 Road Knights
 Shifters
 Spark Plugs

External links
MHRA Online

Automobile associations in the United States
Organizations based in Detroit